The Chicago Telephone Company Kedzie Exchange is a historic telephone exchange building located at 17 S. Homan Avenue in the East Garfield Park neighborhood of Chicago, Illinois, United States.

Built in 1906–07, it was one of the many telephone exchanges built in Chicago in the late 19th and early 20th centuries as telephone use grew rapidly. Chicago architecture firm Pond and Pond designed the Classical Revival building. The building's design is noteworthy for its decorative elements, which include a dentillated cornice and belt course and an arched entrance with floral corbels. Early telephone exchanges were staffed almost entirely by women, and Pond and Pond believed that a decorative design would be more inviting to female workers than a plain and functional building. Major Chicago firm Holabird & Roche designed three additions to the building in 1913, 1928, and 1948. The telephone exchange closed in the 1960s, and the building was subsequently used by the Wilhelm K. Roentgen Elementary School through the 1990s.

The building was added to the National Register of Historic Places on May 30, 2001.

References

Industrial buildings completed in 1907
Industrial buildings and structures on the National Register of Historic Places in Chicago
Neoclassical architecture in Illinois
Public elementary schools in Chicago
Telephone exchange buildings
Former elementary schools in Illinois